The BYU men's volleyball program began its first year in 1990. The current coach is Shawn Olmstead who is in his fifth season coaching the BYU Cougars men's volleyball team.

History

Results by season

All-Americans

First Team

Ethan Watts — 1994
Kevin Hambly — 1995
Ryan Millar — 1997
Ryan Millar — 1998
Ryan Millar — 1999
Ossie Antonetti — 1999
Scott Bunker — 2001
Hector Lebron — 2001
Mike Wall — 2001
Mike Wall — 2002
Joaquin Acosta — 2002
Carlos Moreno — 2004
Fernando Pessoa — 2004
Michael Burke — 2005
Yosleyder Cala — 2007
Ivan Perez — 2007
Russell Holmes — 2008
Andrew Stewart — 2010
Futi Tavana — 2011
Futi Tavana — 2012
Taylor Sander — 2012
Taylor Sander — 2013
Ben Patch — 2013
Taylor Sander — 2014
Ben Patch — 2016
Brenden Sander — 2016
Jake Langlois — 2017
Brenden Sander — 2018
Wil Stanley — 2020
Davide Gardini — 2020
Gabi Garcia Fernandez — 2020
Wil Stanley — 2021
Davide Gardini — 2021
Gabi Garcia Fernandez — 2021

Second Team

Ethan Watts — 1993
Jason Watson — 1994
Ossie Antonetti — 1998
Hector Lebron — 1999
Scott Bunker — 2000
Matt Olsen — 2001
Jonathan Alleman — 2003
Carlos Moreno — 2003
Joe Hillman — 2004
Victor Batista — 2004
Victor Batista — 2005
Michael Burke — 2005
Ivan Perez — 2005
Russell Holmes — 2006
Russell Holmes — 2007
Ivan Perez — 2008
Futi Tavana — 2010
Taylor Sander — 2011
Robb Stowell — 2011
Russ Lavaja — 2013
Jake Langlois — 2016
Gabi Garcia Fernandez — 2018
Gabi Garcia Fernandez — 2019

Third Team

Kevin Hambly — 1994

References